Two ships of the Polish Navy have been named ORP Wilk:

 , a  launched in 1929 and scrapped in 1954
 , a  acquired in 1987

Polish Navy ship names